Louis Lafferre (10 May 1861 – 28 February 1929) was a French politician. He belonged to the Radical Party.

Lafferre was born in Pau, Pyrénées-Atlantiques, and began his political career as a local councillor in Narbonne.  He was a member of the Chamber of Deputies from 1898 to 1919 and a Senator from 1920 to 1924. He was Minister of Labour and Social Security Provisions from 1910 to 1911 and Minister of Public Instruction from 1917 to 1919. On 3 July 1905 he voted in favour of the Law on the Separation of the Churches and the State.

References

External links
 

1861 births
1929 deaths
People from Pau, Pyrénées-Atlantiques
Politicians from Nouvelle-Aquitaine
Radical Party (France) politicians
Government ministers of France
French Ministers of National Education
Members of the 7th Chamber of Deputies of the French Third Republic
Members of the 8th Chamber of Deputies of the French Third Republic
Members of the 9th Chamber of Deputies of the French Third Republic
Members of the 10th Chamber of Deputies of the French Third Republic
Members of the 11th Chamber of Deputies of the French Third Republic
French Senators of the Third Republic
Senators of Hérault
French Freemasons
French people of World War I